Hermitage, United States Virgin Islands
Hermitage, Saint Croix, United States Virgin Islands
Hermitage, Saint John, United States Virgin Islands